The CSKA Sports Complex is an Olympic Village that is part of CSKA Moscow and was prepared to the 1980 Summer Olympics. It is located right next to a military air field.

Its athletics fieldhouse hosted the wrestling competitions while its football fieldhouse hosted the fencing  and the fencing part of the modern pentathlon competitions.

List of sports grounds
 CSKA Universal Sports Hall (formerly CSKA Palace of Sports)
 Light-Athletic Football Complex CSKA
 CSKA Ice Palace
 CSKA Swimming Pool
 CSKA Palace of Sports Martial Arts (formerly CSKA Weightlifting Hall)
 CSKA Gymnastics Hall
 CSKA Tennis Hall

List of sports grounds outside complex
 CSKA Equestrian Resort
 CSKA Shooting Range
 Hills of Krylatskoye, sports ski resort (built in 2002)
 Peschanoye Universal Sports Resort (Grigory Fedotov Stadium)
 Vatutinki Sports Training Resort

References
1980 Summer Olympics official report.  Volume 2. Part 1. pp. 82–5.
 Sports grounds of CSKA Moscow. CSKA Moscow website.

Venues of the 1980 Summer Olympics
CSKA Moscow
Olympic fencing venues
Olympic modern pentathlon venues
Olympic wrestling venues
Sports venues in Russia